Crescendo is the third album by the Brazilian rock band Ultraje a Rigor, released in 1990.

Track listing
"Crescendo" ("Growing Up")
"Filha da Puta" ("Son of a Bitch")
"Volta Comigo" ("Get Back with Me")
"Laços de Família" ("Family Bonds")
"Secretários Eletrônicos" ("Answering Machines")
"Maquininha" ("Little Machines")
"Ricota" ("Ricotta")
"A Constituinte" ("The Constituent")
"Crescendo II - A Missão" ("Growing Up II - The Mission")
"Ice Bucket"
"Coragem" ("Courage")
"Os cães ladram (mas não mordem) e a caravana passa" ("Dogs bark (but don't bite) and the caravan goes on")
"Querida Mamãe" ("Dear Mom")
"O Chiclete" ("The Bubblegum")

References

Ultraje a Rigor albums
1990 albums